The Crucible is a 1961 English language opera written by Robert Ward based on the 1953 play The Crucible by Arthur Miller. It won both the 1962 Pulitzer Prize for Music and the New York Music Critics Circle Citation. The libretto was lightly adapted from Miller's text by Bernard Stambler.

Ward received a commission from the New York City Opera to write the opera. Arthur Miller was involved in selecting Ward. It is one of the most performed operas by an American composer.

Performance history
The Crucible premiered on 26 October 1961 at the New York City Opera (NYCO), with Chester Ludgin as John Proctor, and Norman Treigle as the Reverend John Hale. The production was staged by Allen Fletcher, used scenery designed by Paul Sylbert, and costumes designed by Ruth Morely. The work was next performed in student productions at the University of California, Los Angeles and The Hartt School in West Hartford, Connecticut in 1964. The opera was mounted by the San Francisco Opera for the first time on June 22, 1965 with much of the same cast as the NYCO production. In 1968 the NYCO revived the production, It has since been staged by the Lake George Opera (1966), the Seattle Opera (1968), the Pennsylvania Opera Theater (1989), Central City Opera (1998) and the Tulsa Opera (1995) and Glimmerglass Festival (2016). In April 2020, "The Crucible" was scheduled to be performed by the University of Kentucky Opera Theatre.   The Opera was a produced by The Washington Opera in December 1999.  The new production was directed by Australian Bruce Beresford best known for his work on the film Driving Miss Daisey.   Musical Director and Conductor was Daniel Beckwith.  Mr. Ward attended the company's tech week and provided much appreciated input.

The German premiere in 1963 at Staatstheater Wiesbaden was received with harsh criticism. In 2015 the film director Hugh Hudson gave his premiere as an opera director with The Crucible at Staatstheater Braunschweig. In 2001, the opera was staged in the City Theatre in Ústí nad Labem, Czech Republic, with Robert Ward conducting.

The Crucible had its Australian premiere on 10 October 2008 at the Western Australian Academy of Performing Arts, forty-seven years after its world premiere. It was performed by senior opera-students, conducted by Justin Bischof and directed by Leith Taylor.

The Crucible was performed at the University of South Carolina in the fall of 2022.

Roles

Story
The play takes place during the 1692 Salem witch trials. The Arthur Miller play on which it was based was written as an allegory for McCarthyism and the Red Scare, which occurred in the United States in the 1950s. Miller was himself questioned by the House Committee on Un-American Activities in 1956.

Several women and men in the town are accused of witchcraft by a group of young girls led by Abigail Williams. Her jealousy of John Proctor's wife, Elizabeth, leads Abigail to accuse Elizabeth of witchcraft. John himself is eventually accused and hangs rather than recant, saying he can't dirty his name and stands up for what he believes.

Discography 
 Brooks, Bible, Ludgin, Macurdy; Buckley, 1962 (CRI)
 D’Eramo, Weishoff, Rogers, Karkari, Collins, Kayaalp; Murray, Benevento, Whiteman, Capozzo, Downey, Jones; Purchase Symphony, State University of New York at Purchase Hugh Murphy.  Albany Records Troy 1656/57 (2)

References

External links
 Article about Ward's award that mentions several details

Operas by Robert Ward
English-language operas
Operas
1961 operas
Pulitzer Prize for Music-winning works
Operas set in the United States
Works about McCarthyism
Opera world premieres at New York City Opera
Operas based on plays
Operas set in the 17th century
Salem witch trials in fiction